Marshfield is an extinct town in Vienna Township, Scott County, in the U.S. state of Indiana, about three miles northwest of Scottsburg.  The GNIS classifies it as a populated place.

History
Marshfield functioned as a water stop on the Jeffersonville, Madison and Indianapolis Railroad. It was the site of the third train robbery in American history in 1868 by the Reno Gang of adjacent Jackson County. An Indiana historical marker marks the location of the robbery.

Geography

References

Former populated places in Scott County, Indiana
Former populated places in Indiana